A cart or dray (Australia and New Zealand) is a vehicle designed for transport, using two wheels and normally pulled by one or a pair of draught animals. A handcart is pulled or pushed by one or more people.

It is different from the flatbed trolley also known as a dray, (for freight) or wagon, which is a heavy transport vehicle with four wheels and typically two or more humans.

Over time, the term "cart" has come to mean nearly any small conveyance, including shopping carts, golf carts, gokarts, and UTVs, without regard to number of wheels, load carried, or means of propulsion.

The draught animals used for carts may be horses, donkeys or mules, oxen, and even smaller animals such as goats or large dogs.

History

Carts have been mentioned in literature as far back as the second millennium B.C. Handcarts pushed by humans have been used around the world. In the 19th century, for instance, some Mormons traveling across the plains of the United States between 1856 and 1860 used handcarts.

The history of the cart is closely tied to the history of the wheel.

Carts were often used for judicial punishments, both to transport the condemned – a public humiliation in itself (in Ancient Rome defeated leaders were often carried in the victorious general's triumph) – and even, in England until its substitution by the whipping post under Queen Elizabeth I, to tie the condemned to the cart-tail and administer him or her a public whipping. Tumbrils were commonly associated with the French Revolution as a mobile stage elevating the condemned on the way to the guillotine: this was simply a continuation of earlier practice when they were used as the removable support in the gallows, before Albert Pierrepoint calculated the precise drop needed for instant severance of the nerve column.

Types of carts

Larger carts may be drawn by animals, such as horses, mules, or oxen. They have been in continuous use since the invention of the wheel, in the 4th millennium BC. Carts may be named for the animal that pulls them, such as horsecart or oxcart. In modern times, horsecarts are used in competition while draft horse showing. A dogcart, however, is usually a cart designed to carry hunting dogs: an open cart with two cross-seats back to back; the dogs could be penned between the rear-facing seat and the back end.

The term "cart" (synonymous in this sense with chair) is also used for various kinds of lightweight, two-wheeled carriages, some of them sprung carts (or spring carts), especially those used as open pleasure or sporting vehicles. They could be drawn by a horse, pony or dog. Examples include:

Cocking cart: short-bodied, high, two-wheeled, seat for a groom behind the box; for tandem driving
Dead cart to carry victims of the plague
Dogcart: light, usually one horse, commonly two-wheeled and high, two transverse seats set back to back
Donkey cart: underslung axle, two lengthwise seats; also called pony cart, tub-cart
float: a dropped axle to give an especially low loadbed, for carrying heavy or unstable items such as milk churns. The name survives today as a milkfloat.
Governess cart: light, two-wheeled, entered from the rear, body partly or wholly of wickerwork, seat for two persons along each side; also called governess car, tub-cart
Ralli cart: light, two-wheeled, horse-drawn, for two persons facing forward, or four, two facing forward and two rearward.  The seat is adjustable fore-and-aft to keep the vehicle balanced for two or four people.
Stolkjaerre: two-wheeled, front seat for two, rear seat for the driver; used in Norway
Tax cart: spring cart, formerly subject to a small tax in England; also called taxed cart
Whitechapel cart: spring cart, light, two-wheeled, especially for family or light delivery service
Pushcart, a cart that is pushed by one or more persons:
Baggage cart, pushed by travelers to carry individual luggage
Serving cart, also known as pushcart or go-cart, is a handcart used for serving:
Food cart, a mobile kitchen that is set up on the street to facilitate the sale and marketing of street food to people from the local pedestrian traffic.
Food service cart, also named serving trolley, for serving the food in a restaurant
Pastry cart, for serving pastry
Tea cart, also named teacart, tea trolley and tea wagon, for serving tea or other drinks

The builder of a cart may be known as a cartwright; the surname "Carter" also derives from the occupation of transporting goods by cart or wagon.
Carts have many different shapes, but the basic idea of transporting material (or maintaining a collection of materials in a portable fashion) remains. Carts may have a pair of shafts, one along each side of the draught animal that supports the forward-balanced load in the cart. The shafts are supported by a saddle on the horse. Alternatively (and normally where the animals are oxen or buffalo), the cart may have a single pole between a pair of animals.  The draught traces attach to the axle of the vehicle or to the shafts. The traces are attached to a collar (on horses), to a yoke (on other heavy draught animals) or to a harness on dogs or other light animals.

Traces are made from a range of materials depending on the load and frequency of use. Heavy draught traces are made from iron or steel chain. Lighter traces are often leather and sometimes hemp rope, but plaited horse-hair and other similar decorative materials can be used.

The dray is often associated with the transport of barrels, particularly of beer.

Of the cart types not animal-drawn, perhaps the most common example today is the shopping cart (British English: shopping trolley), which has also come to have a metaphorical meaning in relation to online purchases (here, British English uses the metaphor of the shopping basket). Shopping carts first made their appearance in Oklahoma City in 1937.

In golf, both manual push or pull and electric golf trolleys are designed to carry a golfer's bag, clubs and other equipment. Also, the golf cart, car, or buggy, is a powered vehicle that carries golfers and their equipment around a golf course faster and with less effort than walking.

A Porter's trolley is a type of small, hand-propelled wheeled platform. This can also be called a baggage cart.
since the 13th century.

Autocarts are a type of small, hand-propelled wheeled utility carts having a pivoting base for collapsible storage in vehicles. They eliminate the need for plastic or paper shopping bags and are also used by tradespersons to carry tools, equipment or supplies.

A soap-box cart (also known as a Billy Cart, Go-Cart, Trolley etc.) is a popular children's construction project on wheels, usually pedaled, but also intended for a test race. Similar, but more sophisticated are modern-day pedal cart toys used in general recreation and racing.

An electric cart is an electric vehicle.

The term "Go-Kart", which exists since 1959, also shortened as "Kart", an alternative spelling of "cart", refers to a tiny race car with frame and two-stroke engine; the old term go-cart originally meant a sedan chair or an infant walker

Gallery

See also

Araba
Baggage cart
Barouche
Bicycle trailer
Brougham
Bullock cart
Cabriolet
Carriage
Carter (name)
Cartwright
Chariot
Dicycle
Dogcart (dog-drawn)
Float
Governess cart
Guard stone
Hand truck
Hansom cab
Hobcart
Horse-drawn vehicles
Jaunting car
Lorry (horse-drawn)
Michigan logging wheels
Ralli car
Red River ox cart
Rickshaw
Rully
Serving cart
Shopping cart
Sicilian cart
Sling cart
Sprung cart
Sulky
Toy wagon
Trolley (horse-drawn)
Tumbril
Un-sprung cart
Wain
War wagon
Wheelbarrow

References

External links

Hand and Horse Drawn Firefighting Apparatus 
History of the Shopping Cart

 
Horse driving
Human-powered vehicles
Animal-powered vehicles